Ctenucha editha is a moth of the family Erebidae. It was described by Francis Walker in 1856. It is found on Haiti.

References

editha
Moths described in 1856